Lauren De Crescenzo (born September 3, 1990) is an American professional racing cyclist. She rode in the women's team time trial at the 2015 UCI Road World Championships. A decorated collegiate career included bronze medals in the 2018 USA Cycling Collegiate National Championship Road Race and Individual omnium, as well as gold in the 2019 Individual time trial. On May 31, 2020, she set the women's everesting world record, ascending Hogpen Gap in Blairsville, Georgia 24 times in nine hours and fifty-seven minutes. Her ride covered 111 miles with an average climb gradient of 9.83%. In June 2021, she won the 2021 Unbound Gravel 200 in 12:06:49.

Major results
2021
 1st Overall 2021 Garmin Unbound Gravel 200
 1st SBT GRVL
 1st Gravel Worlds 
 1st The Rad Dirt Fest 
2022
 1st The Midsouth Gravel 
 1st  Overall Tour of the Gila
1st Stage 2
 2nd Overall 2022 Garmin Unbound Gravel 200
 2nd US Pro National Championships Road Race

References

External links
 

1990 births
Living people
American female cyclists
Place of birth missing (living people)
21st-century American women